Michael Blue (born 3 March 1966) is an English music producer, songwriter, engineer and mixer best known for his work with Colbie Caillat, Jason Reeves, Jason Mraz, Five For Fighting and OneRepublic, better known under the stage name Mikal Blue. Originally from County Durham, England, Mikal Blue is currently based in Los Angeles and works from his studio Revolver Recordings in Thousand Oaks, California. In addition to his work as a producer, songwriter, engineer, mixer and instrumentalist, Blue has worked in developing acts such as Augustana, OneRepublic, Colbie Caillat, Angel Taylor, Chandler Juliet and Kevin Hammond. 

Mikal Blue is represented exclusively by Global Positioning Services in Santa Monica, California.

Partial production discography

References

1966 births
Living people
English audio engineers
English record producers
English male singer-songwriters